The Australia national cricket team toured South Africa in September and October 2016 playing a series of five One Day Internationals (ODIs) against the hosts and a solitary ODI against Ireland. The Western Province Cricket Association (WPCA) raised concerns with Cricket South Africa (CSA) about the fifth ODI being held on Yom Kippur. The fixture went ahead as planned, but the WPCA asked that matches do not clash with religious days in the future.

South Africa won the series against Australia 5–0, the first time that Australia had lost all five matches in a five-match ODI series.

Squads

Both James Faulkner and Shaun Marsh were ruled out of the tour due to injury. Marsh was replaced with Usman Khawaja, while no replacement was made for Faulkner. Chris Morris suffered a knee injury ruling him out for two months. He was replaced by Dwaine Pretorius. AB de Villiers was ruled out of series due to elbow injury and was replaced by Rilee Rossouw. AB de Villiers was also ruled of subsequent tour of Australia. Wayne Parnell suffered a rib injury in the second ODI and was ruled out of the rest of the series.

ODI vs Ireland

ODIs vs South Africa

1st ODI

2nd ODI

3rd ODI

4th ODI

5th ODI

References

External links
 Series home at ESPNCricinfo

2016 in Australian cricket
2016 in South African cricket
Australian cricket tours of South Africa
International cricket competitions in 2016–17